Henning Thorsen  (born October 20, 1959) was a strongman competitor from Denmark. Thorsen was a renowned powerlifter, winning his country's superheavyweight championships 5 times. He also won Denmark's Strongest Man six times from 1984,  1987 to 1989, 1991 and 1992. Thorsen participated in the World's Strongest Man  finals of 1990, 1991 and 1992. His best result was a second place in 1991.

Honours
6 times winner of Denmark's Strongest Man (1984, 1987–1989, 1991 and 1992)
1st place Europe's Strongest Man (1990)
4th place World's Strongest Man  (1990)
2nd place World's Strongest Man  (1991)
6th place World's Strongest Man  (1992)

References 

1959 births
Living people
Danish strength athletes